The Daily Tar Heel (DTH) is the independent student newspaper of the University of North Carolina at Chapel Hill. It was founded on February 23, 1893, and became a daily newspaper in 1929. The paper places a focus on university news and sports, but it also includes heavy coverage of Orange County and North Carolina. In 2016, the paper moved from five days a week in print to four, cutting the Tuesday edition. In 2017, the paper began to print on only Monday, Wednesday, and Friday. All editorial content is overseen by student editors and a volunteer student staff of about 230 people. It is the largest news organization in Orange County. In 2021, the paper began to print only on Wednesdays.

History
The Daily Tar Heel circulates 10,000 free copies to more than 225 distribution locations throughout campus and in the surrounding community -- Chapel Hill, Carrboro, Chatham, and Durham. Dailytarheel.com draws an average of 11,400 unique visitors per school day. Revenues from advertising are self-generated through a student-run advertising staff.

The student journalists are solely responsible for all content under the direction of the student editor-in-chief. The 2022-2023 editor-in-chief is Guillermo Molero . A new editor is selected each spring and serves for one year. The editor is the public face of the paper and hires the rest of the editorial staff, which includes a managing editor and editors for each of the newsroom's sections desk.

The paper employs two full-time professionals, about 80 paid part-time students, and more than 150 student volunteer writers. The student editor has full control over the editorial content of the paper. Business matters are overseen by a full-time, professional general manager, Erica Perel; a board of directors serves as publisher and has final say over matters such as the newspaper's budget.

Early history

The newspaper was first published on February 23, 1893, as a four-page weekly tabloid called The Tar Heel. It aimed to promote "the thorough discussion of all points pertaining to the advancement and growth of the University." Funded by the campus athletic association, it placed much of its emphasis on campus sports and Greek life and boasted of 250 subscribers.

By 1920, the paper's size had increased to six pages, and under editor Thomas Wolfe the paper moved to a twice-a-week format in September 1920. In 1923, it came out from under the auspices of the athletic association and became governed by the Student Publications Union Board, which at the time was in charge of all campus publications. Students paid a fee of $5.50 to fund the publications. Publication increased to three days in 1925 and published the first summer edition in 1927. The student body voted in favor of increasing funding to the DTH in 1929 in a vote of 666 to 128. The vote enabled the paper, then led by editor Walter Spearman, to publish six times a week. The paper changed its name to The Daily Tar Heel.

In 1943, the paper scaled back publication to twice weekly. In 1946, The Daily Tar Heel returned to daily publication with the goal of becoming, in the words of student editors, "the greatest college newspaper in the world."

The famous broadcaster Charles Kuralt, who was DTH editor in 1954, wrote in his book A Life on the Road of being called "a pawn of the Communists" on the floor of the state legislature after the newspaper published a spoof edition critical of Sen. Joseph McCarthy. The student legislature formed a committee in 1955 to "investigate quality and circulation problems at the DTH."

Independence
In the 1970s and 1980s, student editors used the paper's front-page quote to agitate many on campus; selections included Nietzsche's "God is dead." The paper's use of student fees was called into question in July 1972, when four students filed suit against the paper. The students objected to the use of student fees used to publish articles they did not agree with. The DTH collected donations to pay for its legal defense, and ultimately won an assurance of at least 16 percent of all student fees in 1977. An independent publishing board was also established, though the paper's budget remained tied to the Student Congress for yearly approval.

In 1989, the DTH incorporated as a separate educational 501(c)(3) non-profit entity. The paper voluntarily stopped taking student fee money in 1993, making it completely financially independent from the university for the first time. That allowed the DTH to begin its current process of allowing an 11-member committee of staffers and community members to select the next editor. Previously, the position had been filled in campuswide elections. Peter Wallsten was the last DTH editor selected by campuswide elections.

Recent years

On November 19, 1994, the DTH became one of the first newspapers of any kind to publish an online edition.

After 1,500 copies of the Carolina Review were stolen in 1996, the DTH fought for access to the accused students' Honor Court hearings. The state Supreme Court's 1998 ruling established the Honor Court as a public body.

The paper published a column in 2005 by student Jillian Bandes that supported the racial profiling of Arabs at airports — a piece that began with the line, "I want all Arabs to be stripped naked and cavity-searched if they get within 100 yards of an airport.". The column made national headlines and ultimately led to the columnist's dismissal, but officially only for her quoting a source in a manner considered out-of-context. A few months later, in the midst of the Jyllands-Posten Muhammad cartoons controversy, it published a cartoon depicting the Prophet appearing to decry both sides in the debate. Both pieces sparked loud debate on campus. The cartoon was a popular local-news item and prompted a few dozen protesters to stage sit-ins in the DTH newsroom.

During the summer of 2010, the newsroom moved out of the student union and into a  office a block away from campus, at 151 E. Rosemary Street. The move doubled the amount of office space available to staff and placed the paper one-tenth of a mile away from its original 1893 office. Previously, the staff worked out of the Frank Porter Graham Student Union and paid rent to the university.

In October 2010, The Daily Tar Heel joined a coalition of eight media organizations in a lawsuit against UNC for public records. The lawsuit concerns records related to UNC's investigation into alleged improper relationships with athletic agents and academic misconduct surrounding the football team.

In September 2016, The Daily Tar Heel filed the lawsuit against UNC to obtain access to public records concerning the identification of students or employees who have committed rape or sexual assault. The lawsuit was on behalf of itself, the Capital Broadcasting Company, the Charlotte Observer Publishing Company and The Durham Herald Company. On May 3, 2017, Judge Allen Baddour, a Superior Court Judge in Wake and Orange County, ruled that UNC is not required to provide those public records. He stated that Family Educational Rights and Privacy Act and the State Human Resources Act protects students and employees, respectively.

The DTH has a long-standing bet with editors of The Chronicle, Duke University's student newspaper. When the two schools' men's basketball teams first play, the losing school's paper must run its masthead in the other school's color. The losing school's paper must also place the winning school's logo on their editorial page and declare the winning school is "still the best" on the front page.

In conjuncture with the Daily Tar Heel financial struggles, in February 2018 the newsroom was moved from the large Rosemary Street office to a smaller, more consolidated space at 210 E. Franklin Street in Suite 210. Though the move has strong ties to the fiscal state of The Daily Tar Heel, their newer office is closer to UNC's central campus, and is in the midst of action on Franklin Street.

Financial struggle 
Since 2011, The Daily Tar Heel has been losing money. In recent years, the 124-year-old newspaper has had an annual deficit of about $200,000. Betsy Donovan, general manager of The Daily Tar Heel, cited changes in the industry, specifically the decline in print advertising, for the organization's financial situation. In a Medium essay in August 2016, she wrote that the Tar Heel has two years to "figure out its finances."

To create more revenue, Donovan launched The 1893 Brand Studio, an in-house agency for services and creative consulting, in 2017. The Tar Heel has also cut the number of days in print to three. In March 2017, Donovan said the University of North Carolina's 2017 men's basketball national championship reduced the Tar Heels deficit from about $100,000 to less than $50,000 for the fiscal year. The organization's annual revenue at the time was just under $900,000 per year.

Accolades and awards
The DTH has been recognized as one of the best college newspapers in the country. It was named the best college newspaper by The Princeton Review in 2007 and 2011 and appeared in the list's top 5 in 2010, 2012, and 2013. Additionally, The Daily Tar Heel has won many awards over the years at the national level. Listed below are some of the prominent honors the DTH has received. Years noted represent the previous school year, unless otherwise noted.

Associated Collegiate Press – National Pacemaker Awards
 Newspaper Pacemaker
 Winner: 1996, 1998, 2001, 2003, 2005, 2008, 2013, 2015, 2016, 2017
 Finalist: 1994, 2000, 2004, 2006, 2010, 2011, 2012
 Online Pacemaker
 Winner: 2005, 2012, 2013, 2014
 Finalist: 2006, 2007, 2009, 2010, 2016
 Reporter of the Year
 Winner: 2013
 Honorable Mention: 2017
 Story of the Year
 Winner: 2013 (Sports), 2016 (Editorial/Opinion), 2017 (Feature and Sports)
Society of Professional Journalists – National Mark of Excellence Awards
 Sports Writing
 Finalist: 2002
 Best all-around daily student newspaper
 Finalist: 2009
The DTH staff also wins awards in competitions against professional newspapers in North Carolina. Since 2001, the newspaper has won more than a half-dozen awards from the North Carolina Press Association for its photography, news writing, and design. It has also won more than two dozen first-place advertising awards in its division, which comprises paid dailies with circulations between 15,000 and 34,999.

In February 2011, the paper was awarded the second place NCPA general excellence award for its division, becoming the first college paper in the state to earn a general excellence award. The paper also placed first in the state for its higher education coverage.

Notable alumni
 Cole Campbell, former St. Louis Post-Dispatch editor
 Howie Carr, talk radio host at WRKO in Boston and various affiliates; columnist with the Boston Herald
 W. Horace Carter, Pulitzer Prize winner for his reporting on the Ku Klux Klan
 Jonathan W. Daniels, author and White House Press Secretary for Franklin D. Roosevelt and Harry S. Truman
 Peter Gammons, ESPN sportswriter and broadcaster
 Gail Godwin, novelist and short story writer who wrote a column called "Carolina Carrousel" while a student at UNC
 Louis Harris, journalist who established the Harris Poll
 Mary Junck, president, CEO and chairman of Lee Enterprises, which publishes 54 daily newspapers
 Wayne King, Pulitzer Prize winner, Detroit Free Press and former writer for The New York Times
 Charles Kuralt, award-winning CBS journalist and author
 Rob Nelson, co-anchor of ABC's World News Now and America This Morning
 Robyn Tomlin, managing editor of the Dallas Morning News
 William Woestendiek, Pulitzer Prize-winning editor and journalist
 Thomas Wolfe, novelist and playwright
 Jonathan Yardley, Washington Post book columnist
 Edwin Yoder, syndicated columnist and Pulitzer Prize winner

References

External links

 Daily Tar Heel website
 Daily Tar Heel PDF issues from 2009-2017
Daily Tar Heel issues from 1893-2008
 Daily Tar Heel headline archive

Publications established in 1893
University of North Carolina at Chapel Hill media
University of North Carolina at Chapel Hill student organizations
Daily newspapers published in North Carolina
Student newspapers published in North Carolina